Moya O'Sullivan Macarthur (8 June 1926 – 16 January 2018) was an Australian-born actress who worked both locally and briefly in the United Kingdom. She was best known for her long-running role as the popular character Marlene Kratz in the soap opera Neighbours between 1994 and 1997.
Alex Fletcher from Digital Spy made Marlene their "DS Icon" on 7 January 2011, calling her a legendary and special character. Fletcher also stated that "Marlene, played by the delightful Moya O'Sullivan, was a crucial cog in the Golden Age of Neighbours in the '90s."

Early life and career
O'Sullivan was born to Eugene and Nancy O'Sullivan (née Morgan) and had an older brother, Peter. Having graduated from school, she was tutored in drama classes under Dorothy Hemingway and started her career as a stage performer in the 1950s with the Mosman Theatre Company.

Radio, theatre, teleplays and telemovies
She trained in radio under Rosalind Kennerdale, and through her gained agent John Cover, the husband of actress Queenie Ashton, who had a company, Central Casting. O'Sullivan appeared in numerous radio productions, such as Dr. Paul, When a Girl Marries, Blue Hills and Life with Dexter. 
 
With the advent of television, she became a familiar face in televised plays, as well as featuring in commercial adverts. She made her debut in 1960 in the ABC production Farewell, Farewell Eugene, and appeared in The Slaughter of St Teresas Day, occasionally popping up in made-for-TV films.

Career in England
By the mid-1960s, O'Sullivan had decided to try her luck in England, where she featured in radio, television and on the West End stage circuit. Notable roles were in J.P. Donleavy's production A Singular Man, and A Harp in the South for BBC TV. She returned to Australia in 1965, where she featured in the theatrical production Inadmissible Evidence.

Television roles
O'Sullivan was a staple on the small screen in soap operas and serials in Australia, beginning in 1961 with the daytime soap opera The Story of Peter Gray. Her early roles included playing several parts in Homicide and Division 4. A prominent role was her three-month stint in the serial Number 96 as Phyllis Pratt in the 1970s.
 
She subsequently appeared in Sons and Daughters as Aileen Keegan, and had several roles in A Country Practice throughout the 1980s.

She continued acting throughout the 2000s, including Home and Away in 2002, and several guest appearances in All Saints from 2001 and 2008.  O'Sullivan never had any other long-standing roles; she was a well-recognized feature player as a prominent guest artist of many a television series spanning over 60 years, later portraying hapless old grannies.

In 2005, she reprised the role of Marlene Kratz, along with many ex-cast members, for an episode commemorating the Neighbours 20th anniversary in a reunion special.

O'Sullivan also became popular via memorable guesting appearances in Cop Shop as Lorna Close (later O'Reilly), mother to Valerie Close-Johnson and mother-in-law to Jeffrey Johnson, and in Hey Dad..! as Grandma Lois Kelly, and later in The Adventures of Skippy as Thelma Woods in the 2000s. She had previously appeared in the earlier 1960s original series in television's younger days as Mrs Mason.

Her final part was in Tricky Business in 2012.

Death
O'Sullivan died aged 91 in Bondi Junction, New South Wales, Australia on 16 January 2018.

Filmography

FILM

TELEVISION

References

External links

1926 births
2018 deaths
20th-century Australian actresses
Australian soap opera actresses
21st-century Australian women
21st-century Australian people
Actresses from Melbourne